Qullpani (Aymara qullpa saltpeter, -ni a suffix, "the one with saltpeter", also spelled Cullpane) is a mountain in the Andes of Peru which reaches a height of approximately . It is located in the Arequipa Region, Arequipa Province, Tarucani District, and in the Moquegua Region, General Sánchez Cerro Province, Matalaque District. Qullpani lies southwest of the Ubinas volcano.

References 

Mountains of Arequipa Region
Mountains of Moquegua Region
Mountains of Peru